The Usekay is a river in Perm Krai, Russia, a left tributary of the Aspa, which in turn is a tributary of the Iren.

References 

Rivers of Perm Krai